Zdenka Nemeškalová-Jiroudková is a Czech numismatist and archaeologist. She was born in Prague on 9 April 1928.

Career 
During her career she studied Czech coin finds, including those of thirteenth-century Venetian coins at Prague Castle and coin finds from  Vízmburk. She has worked on national and international numismatic collections, including at Copenhagen Museum, as well as the finds of Roman coins in Hradec Králové Museum. She specialises in the study of Celtic coinages and has public widely on the subject, including the coin treasure from Starý Kolín. She has also studied the metallurgy of the gold in Celtic staters. She was a pioneer of assessing Czech coin finds within their archaeological contexts. Particular studies have included coins found in West Bohemia.

Publications
 1960, Nález mince v románské bazilice v Teplicích
 1961, K současným úkolům numismatiky doby římské
 1963, Římské mince v Čechách a jejich dějinný význam
 1986, Nález mincí tolarového údobí v Chlečicích, o. Strakonice: (tab. I - IV)
 1993, Numismatický sborník
 1998, Keltský poklad ze Starého Kolína

References 

Living people
1928 births
Women numismatists
Czech archaeologists
Czech women archaeologists
Czech numismatists
Writers from Prague

cs:Vízmburk